Teribe is a town and corregimiento in the Naso Tjër Di Comarca of Panama. It was created by Law 5 of January 19, 1998. Its population as of 2000 was 1,808.

References

Populated places in Bocas del Toro Province
Corregimientos of Bocas del Toro Province